Aaron Whitchurch (born 3 May 1992) is an Australian professional rugby league footballer who most recently played for the Brisbane Broncos in the National Rugby League.

Playing career
Born in Fremantle, Western Australia. Whitchurch moved to Queensland at age eight, playing in his first junior football team with the Stanley River Wolves before being signed by the Brisbane Broncos. Whitchurch played for the Broncos' NYC team from 2010 to 2012, scoring 13 tries in 36 games.

In February 2012, Whitchurch's Brisbane Broncos coach, Anthony Griffin, revealed that Whitchurch's future was in the forwards due to his strength and speed.

In Round 17 of the 2012 NRL season, Whitchurch made his NRL debut for the Broncos against the Cronulla-Sutherland Sharks. He scored a try on debut.

Representative career

References

External links

Brisbane Broncos profile
NRL profile

1992 births
Living people
Australian rugby league players
Brisbane Broncos players
Redcliffe Dolphins players
Rugby league centres
Rugby league second-rows
Rugby league players from Fremantle